Anna Sofía Sevdal Jakobsen (born 20 December 1993), known as Ansy Sevdal, is a Faroese football midfielder who currently plays for EB/Streymur/Skála and the Faroe Islands women's national football team.

Personal life 
She is the younger sister of fellow Faroese international Heidi Sevdal.

Honours 

EB/Streymur/Skála
1. deild kvinnur: 2017, 2018 
Steypakappingin kvinnur: 2017, 2018

References 

1993 births
Living people
Faroese women's footballers
Faroe Islands women's international footballers
Women's association football midfielders